"Candy Pop" is a song recorded by South Korean girl group Twice. It is the group's second Japanese maxi single, featuring three other tracks. The song was pre-released as a digital single on January 12, 2018, and the CD single was released on February 7 by Warner Music Japan.

The single album recorded the highest number of copies sold on the first day of sales out of all Korean girl groups who debuted in Japan.

Background and release
On December 22, 2017, Twice announced the release of their second Japanese single titled "Candy Pop", along with several teaser images for the new track. A sneak peek of its B-side track titled "Brand New Girl" was also released the same day, as it was selected as the commercial music for Line's Clova Friends smart speaker. On January 12, 2018, "Candy Pop" was pre-released as a digital single on various online music portals. On January 23, "Brand New Girl" was pre-released as a digital single on Line Music.

The CD single was officially released on February 7. "Candy Pop" and "Brand New Girl" were also digitally released on various South Korean music sites the same day.

Composition

"Candy Pop" was composed by Woo Min Lee "collapsedone" and Mayu Wakisaka, who previously collaborated with Twice on "Knock Knock".

Music video
The full music video of "Candy Pop" was uploaded online on January 12, 2018. The anime-style video was directed by Takahiko Kyōgoku, best known for his work as the director of anime television series Love Live!, in collaboration with Naive Creative Production, the team behind most of Twice's previous music videos. The story line was written by Park Jin-young. There are also hidden characters which were illustrated by member Chaeyoung.

It features the nine members as cartoon singers in a candy-coated realm, filming on set of a music video that a human girl is watching. They see the girl who looks lonely and sad, and want to encourage her. With the help of the animated character of Park Jin-young, Twice transforms into human, escapes the candy land and heads to the human world in a candy car to meet the girl.

The music video ranked at No. 6 on 2018 YouTube's Top Trend Music Video in Japan, the group's second song on the list.

Promotion
"Candy Pop" and "Brand New Girl" were first performed during Twice Showcase Live Tour 2018 "Candy Pop", which began on January 19, 2018, in Seto, Aichi. "Candy Pop" was also performed on Music Station on February 2. "Candy Pop" and "Brand New Girl" were also featured on TBS's Count Down TV on February 3 and 10, respectively.

Commercial performance
The CD single debuted atop the daily ranking of Oricon Singles Chart with 117,486 units sold on its release day. It recorded the highest number of copies sold on the first day of sales out of all Korean girl groups who debuted in Japan. The CD single topped the weekly Oricon Singles Chart with 265,758 copies sold. On Oricon Digital Singles Chart, it debuted at number 14 with 7,517 downloads. It was also reported that it sold 333,633 copies in pre-orders, while Billboard Japan recorded 303,746 unit sales from February 5–11, 2018. On February 24, "Candy Pop" exceeded 400,000 shipments.

Track listing

Content production
Credits adapted from CD single liner notes.

Locations
 Recording
 JYPE Studios, Seoul, South Korea

 Mixing
 Mirrorball Studios, North Hollywood, California ("Candy Pop")
 I to I Communications, Tokyo, Japan ("Brand New Girl")

 Mastering
 Sterling Sound, New York City, New York

Personnel
 JYP Entertainment staff

 Song Ji-eun "Shannen" (JYP Entertainment Japan) – executive producer
 Jimmy Jeong (JYP Entertainment) – executive producer
 Cho Hae-sung (JYP Entertainment) – executive producer
 J. Y. Park "The Asiansoul" – producer
 Yasuhiro Suziki (JYP Entertainment Japan) – strategic planning
 Rinko Narita (JYP Entertainment Japan) – A&R
 Lee Ji-hoon (JYP Entertainment Japan) – A&R
 Choi Ji-yeon (JYP Entertainment Japan) – A&R
 Ayumi Saiki (JYP Entertainment Japan) – artist and fan marketing
 Lee Seong-ah (JYP Entertainment Japan) – artist and fan marketing
 Kim Sung-bub (JYP Entertainment Japan) – artist and fan marketing
 Hong Mina (JYP Entertainment Japan) – artist and fan marketing
 Kang Min-ju (JYP Entertainment Japan) – artist and fan marketing
 Shin Hyun-kuk – Twice team
 Chung Hae-joon – Twice team
 Joo Bo-ra – Twice team
 Shin Seon-hwa – Twice team
 Shin Sae-rom – Twice team
 Kim Na-yeon – Twice team
 Yoo Jong-beom – Twice team
 Park Rae-chang – Twice team
 Jun Yong-jin – Twice team
 Yang Da-seol – Twice team
 Jung Kyoung-hee (JYP Entertainment Japan) – administration
 Park Nam-yong (JYP Entertainment) – performance director
 Kim Hyung-woong (JYP Entertainment) – performance director
 Yun Hee-so (JYP Entertainment) – performance director
 Na Tae-hoon (JYP Entertainment) – performance director
 Yoo Kwang-yeol (JYP Entertainment) – performance director
 Kang Da-sol (JYP Entertainment) – performance director
 Lee Tae-sub (JYP Entertainment) – recording engineer
 Choi Hye-jin (JYP Entertainment) – recording engineer
 Eom Se-hee (JYP Entertainment) – recording engineer
 Lim Hong-jin (JYP Entertainment) – recording engineer
 Jang Han-soo (JYP Entertainment) – recording engineer
 Lee Jeong-yun "Lia" (JYP Publishing) – publishing
 Kim Min-ji (JYP Publishing) – publishing
 Shin Da-ye (JYP Publishing) – publishing
 Cho Hyun-woo (JYP Publishing) – publishing

 Warner Music Japan staff

 Kaz Kobayashi – executive producer
 Hayato Kajino – supervisor
 Rie Sawaoka – supervisor
 Yukiyasu "German" Fujii – chief A&R
 Toshio Kai – A&R
 Nao Fuse – A&R
 Norihiro Fukuda – A&R
 Hidetsugu Sato – sales promotion
 Naoki Takami – digital planning and marketing
 Mamoru Fukumitsu – WMJ "JYP room"
 Han Gui-taek – WMJ "JYP room"
 Kimi Yoneda – WMJ "JYP room"
 Eom Eun-kyung – WMJ "JYP room"
 Hong Mina – WMJ "JYP room"
 Kim Jang-ho – WMJ "JYP room"
 Masayo Kuroda – product coordination
 Mizuho Makizaka – A&R secretary
 Momoko Kitasato – A&R secretary

 Japanese recording staff
 Goei Ito (Obelisk) – music director
 Yu-ki Kokubo (Obelisk) – recording director
 Satoshi Sasamoto – Pro Tools operation

 Design staff

 Toshiyuki Suzuki (United Lounge Tokyo) – art direction
 Yasuhiro Uaeda (United Lounge Tokyo) – design
 Tommy – photography
 Masaaki Mitsuzono – jacket photo style director
 Choi Hee-sun (F. Choi) - music video style director
 Lim Ji-hyun (F. Choi) - music video style director
 F. Choi - music video style director
 Lee Jin-young (F. Choi) - music video assistant stylist
 Heo Su-yeon (F. Choi) - music video assistant stylist
 Jung Nan-young (Lulu Hair Makeup Studio) – hair director
 Choi Ji-young (Lulu Hair Makeup Studio) – hair director
 Son Eun-hee (Lulu Hair Makeup Studio) – hair director
 Jo Sang-ki (Lulu Hair Makeup Studio) – makeup director
 Jeon Dallae (Lulu Hair Makeup Studio) – makeup director
 Zia (Lulu Hair Makeup Studio) – makeup director
 Won Jung-yo – makeup director
 Choi Su-ji – assistant makeup director

 Movie staff

 Kim Young-jo (Naive Production) – music video director
 Yoo Seung-woo (Naive Production) – music video director
 Takahiko Kyōgoku – music video animation director
 Hiroyuki Katō (OLM Team Kato) – music video animation producer
 Han Gui-taek – music video making and jacket shooting making movie director
 Yu Yamaguchi (Warner Music Mastering) – DVD authoring

 Other personnel
 Min Lee "collapsedone" – all instruments and computer programming (on "Candy Pop")
 Na.Zu.Na – all instruments (on "Brand New Girl")
 Twice – background vocals
 Ikuko Tsutsumi – background vocals
 Mayu Wakisaka – background vocals and vocal recording director (on "Candy Pop")
 Tony Maserati – mixing engineer (on "Candy Pop")
 Naoki Yamada – mixing engineer (on "Brand New Girl")
 Ted Jensen at Sterling Sound – mastering engineer

Charts

Weekly charts

Year-end charts

Certifications

Accolades

References

2018 singles
2018 songs
J-pop songs
Japanese-language songs
Twice (group) songs
Warner Music Japan singles
Oricon Weekly number-one singles
Billboard Japan Hot 100 number-one singles